The 1904 international cricket season was from April 1904 to September 1904.

Season overview

May

South Africa in England

September

England in Netherlands

References

International cricket competitions by season
1904 in cricket